Ilse Kaschube (later Zeisler, born 25 June 1953 in Altentreptow, Bezirk Neubrandenburg) is an East German sprint canoer who competed in the early 1970s. She won a silver medal in the K-2 500 m event at the 1972 Summer Olympics in Munich.

Kaschube also won two gold medals at the ICF Canoe Sprint World Championships with one in the K-2 500 m event (1973) and one in the K-4 500 m event (1974).

References

1953 births
Living people
People from Altentreptow
People from Bezirk Neubrandenburg
East German female canoeists
Sportspeople from Mecklenburg-Western Pomerania
Olympic canoeists of East Germany
Canoeists at the 1972 Summer Olympics
Olympic silver medalists for East Germany
Olympic medalists in canoeing
Medalists at the 1972 Summer Olympics
ICF Canoe Sprint World Championships medalists in kayak
Recipients of the Patriotic Order of Merit in bronze